

The following lists events that happened during 1901 in Afghanistan.

Incumbents
 Monarch – Abdur Rahman Khan (until October 1), Habibullah Khan (starting October 1)

Events
October 3 – The amir Abdor Rahman Khan dies at Kabul. His eldest son, Habibullah Khan, succeeds to the throne.

See also
History of Afghanistan

References

 
Afghanistan
Years of the 20th century in Afghanistan
Afghanistan
1900s in Afghanistan